Holdemania massiliensis  is a Gram-positive, anaerobic, non-spore-forming and non-motile bacterium from the genus Holdemania which has been isolated from human feces.

References

External links
Type strain of Holdemania massiliensis at BacDive -  the Bacterial Diversity Metadatabase

Erysipelotrichia
Bacteria described in 2013
Candidatus taxa